St Budeaux Ferry Road railway station is a suburban station in St Budeaux, Plymouth, England.

It is served by Great Western Railway services during the rush hour only. The vast majority of services pass through non-stop due to the proximity of : the entrances to the two stations are directly opposite each other. To the west, the line singles and crosses into Cornwall on the Royal Albert Bridge.

The station is unstaffed with step-free access to both platforms.

History
The station was opened by the Great Western Railway on 1 June 1904 as St Budeaux Platform, and was later renamed St Budeaux Ferry Road to avoid confusion with the London and South Western Railway  station.

The reason for the separate stations is due to the two railways taking different routes into the city. A junction was laid between the two lines during World War II and the London and South Western Railway line between Victoria Road and  closed in 1964.

Services
A more frequent service to Plymouth operates from the adjacent St Budeaux Victoria Road on the Tamar Valley Line.

References

Further reading

Railway stations in Plymouth, Devon
Former Great Western Railway stations
Railway stations in Great Britain opened in 1904
Railway stations served by Great Western Railway
DfT Category C2 stations